

Events

January events
January 1 – After the reindependence of Estonia the national railway company Eesti Raudtee is established.

March events
March 3 – The Podsosenka train disaster near Nelidovo, Tver Oblast in Russia kills 43.

April events
 April 3 – The Goderich Exeter Railway begins operations in Ontario, Canada.
 April 3 – The new light rail system in Baltimore, Maryland, USA, opens for service on a very limited basis, running only on days with baseball games at a new Camden Yards stadium station it serves, and only for a period of about 2 hours before and after each game (see May 17).
 April 6 – The first section of Manchester Metrolink, in Manchester, England, opens.
 April 14 - The Madrid-Seville AVE line opens

May events
 May 12 – Republika Srpska Railways formally established.
 May 17 – Regular service begins on the new Baltimore Light Rail system (see April 3).

July events 
 July 1 – JR East introduces the Yamagata Shinkansen, the first mini-shinkansen service, on the Ōu Main Line connecting Fukushima and Yamagata.

August events
 August 27 – The 3200-series rapid transit cars (3201–3457), built by Morrison-Knudsen of Hornell, New York, are placed in service on the Chicago "L" system, retiring the last of the old 6000-series cars from the 1950s. The 3200-series cars are operated on the Ravenswood Line, and eventually, the upcoming Midway Airport Line the following year.

October events 
 October 26 – Southern California's Metrolink opens.
 October – Public rail transport in Jamaica ceases operation.

December events 
 December 20 – Western Australian Premier Dr. Carmen Lawrence presides over official opening ceremonies for Warwick railway station on the Transperth Joondalup Line.
 December 23 – Nuevo Central Argentino is granted a concession to operate freight trains over former Ferrocarriles Argentinos tracks in and around Buenos Aires.

Unknown date events
 General Motors Electro-Motive Division introduces the EMD SD70.
 Paul Tellier is appointed to the presidency of Canadian National.
 Wisconsin & Calumet Railroad is acquired by the Wisconsin & Southern Railroad
 Amtrak commissions three prototype RoadRailers for testing behind regular revenue passenger trains.
 South African Railways ceases use of steam locomotives (other than Outeniqua Choo Tjoe tourist operation).
 Indian Railways introduces 'women only' trains on Mumbai Western and Central suburban lines
 Voralpen Express in Switzerland given this name.
 Buses replace streetcars along the Girard Avenue Line in Philadelphia – rail service would not be restored for thirteen years.

Accidents

Deaths

October deaths 
 October 19 – H. Reid, prominent railroad photographer and historian (b. 1925).

References